Cornelius "Con" O'Toole (25 February 1929 – 2 April 2011) was an Australian rules footballer who played with Melbourne in the Victorian Football League (VFL).

O'Toole, a ruckman from Ultima, was a member of Melbourne's 1949 reserves premiership team. The following year he made four appearances in the seniors and then returned to the Ultima Football Club, as captain-coach.

He spent the 1954 football season with Swan Hill, whom he captain-coached.

In 1955 he made his way to Goulburn Valley Football League club Rushworth and won that year's Morrison Medal while acting as coach.

When his employment with the Victoria Police Force brought him to Rochester he was appointed captain-coach of the town's Bendigo Football League side, the Rochester Tigers. He guided the club to back to back premierships in 1962 and 1963, the former finishing the season undefeated.

References

1929 births
Australian rules footballers from Victoria (Australia)
Melbourne Football Club players
Rochester Football Club players
2011 deaths